The 1971 Camden Council election took place on 13 May 1971 to elect members of Camden London Borough Council in London, England. The whole council was up for election and the Labour party gained overall control of the council.

Background

Election result

Ward results

Adelaide

Belsize

Bloomsbury

Camden

Chalk Farm

Gospel Oak

Grafton

Hampstead Town

Highgate

Holborn

Kilburn

King's Cross

Priory

Regent's Park

St John's

St Pancras

Swiss Cottage

West End

References

1971
1971 London Borough council elections